The 2017 Summit League men's soccer tournament, was the 24th edition of the tournament. It determined the Summit League's automatic berth into the 2017 NCAA Division I Men's Soccer Championship.

The tournament was hosted by the University of Nebraska Omaha and all matches were contested at Al F. Caniglia Field. Tournament hosts Omaha reached the final against Denver, creating a repeat of the 2016 Summit League Men's Soccer Tournament championship game.

For only the second time in tournament history, and for the first time since 2008, the championship was determined through a penalty shoot-out. The longest shoot-out in Summit League history, the marathon of penalty kicks went for 12 rounds, with two players on each side kicking twice from the penalty mark. Omaha were able to get the better of Denver, winning the shoot-out 9-8 thanks to a miss from Denver's Graham Smith and a successfully converted penalty from Emmanuel Hamzat.

Omaha earned their first ever college conference tournament championship, and their first ever berth into the NCAA Division I men's soccer tournament. In the NCAA Tourney, Omaha played at No. 13, Florida International, and lost in the first round, 2-0.

Seeds
The top four teams participate in the tournament. The seeding is based on the program's conference record during the 2017 Summit League season.

Bracket

Results

Semifinals

Championship

Statistics

Goals

Assists

Shutouts

See also 
Summit League Men's Soccer Tournament
2017 Summit League Women's Soccer Tournament

References

External links 
Summit League Men's Soccer Tournament Central

tournament 2016
Summit League Men's Soccer
Summit League Men's Soccer Tournament